Vexitomina regia is a species of sea snail, a marine gastropod mollusk in the family Horaiclavidae.

Description
The periphery shows a double row of nodules. The whorls are smooth above and granulated below it. The anal sinus is small. The color of the shell is whitish maculated with chestnut.

Distribution
This marine species occurs in the Indo-West Pacific (Mauritius, the Philippines, Loyalty Islands) and off Australia (Queensland).

References

  Reeve, L.A. 1842. Conchologia Systematica or Complete System of Conchology: in which the Lepades and Conchiferous Mollusca are described and classified according to their natural organization and habits. London : Longman, Brown, Green & Longmans Vol. 2 337 pp., pls 131–300.
 Souverbie, M. & Montrouzier, R.P. 1874. Descriptions d'espèces nouvelles de l'Archipel Calédonien. Journal de Conchyliologie 22: 187-201
 G.W. Tryon (1884) Manual of Conchology, structural and systematic, with illustrations of the species, vol. VI; Philadelphia, Academy of Natural Sciences
  Hedley, C. 1922. A revision of the Australian Turridae. Records of the Australian Museum 13(6): 213-359, pls 42-56
 Powell, A.W.B. 1969. The family Turridae in the Indo-Pacific. Part. 2. The subfamily Turriculinae. Indo-Pacific Mollusca 2(10): 207–415, pls 188-324
 Wilson, B. 1994. Australian Marine Shells. Prosobranch Gastropods. Kallaroo, WA : Odyssey Publishing Vol. 2 370 pp.

External links
 
  Tucker, J.K. 2004 Catalog of recent and fossil turrids (Mollusca: Gastropoda). Zootaxa 682:1-1295

regia
Gastropods described in 1842